In enzymology, an indole-3-acetate beta-glucosyltransferase is an enzyme that catalyzes the chemical reaction

UDP-glucose + (indol-3-yl)acetate  UDP + 1-O-(indol-3-yl)acetyl-beta-D-glucose

Thus, the two substrates of this enzyme are UDP-glucose and (indol-3-yl)acetate, whereas its two products are UDP and 1-O-(indol-3-yl)acetyl-beta-D-glucose.

This enzyme belongs to the family of glycosyltransferases, specifically the hexosyltransferases.  The systematic name of this enzyme class is UDP-glucose:(indol-3-yl)acetate beta-D-glucosyltransferase. Other names in common use include uridine diphosphoglucose-indoleacetate glucosyltransferase, UDPG-indol-3-ylacetyl glucosyl transferase, UDP-glucose:indol-3-ylacetate glucosyltransferase, indol-3-ylacetylglucose synthase, UDP-glucose:indol-3-ylacetate glucosyl-transferase, IAGlu synthase, IAA-glucose synthase, and UDP-glucose:indole-3-acetate beta-D-glucosyltransferase.

References

 

EC 2.4.1
Enzymes of unknown structure